Baketwernel (also spelled Baketwerel) was an ancient Egyptian queen during the 20th Dynasty. She is likely to have been the Great Royal Wife of Ramesses IX.

Burial
She was buried in the tomb KV10, built for the late 19th Dynasty usurper-pharaoh Amenmesse, where a chamber was redecorated for her use. Because of this fact, she was previously thought to have been Amenmesse's wife.

Dodson (1987) has argued that the redecoration in tomb KV10 was done during the reign of Ramesses IX. Schaden and Ertman (1989) however claim that some of the work in the room for Baketwerel may have been done during the reign of Queen Tausret. If so, this would suggest an earlier date for Queen Baketwernel.

Sources

12th-century BC Egyptian women
Queens consort of the Twentieth Dynasty of Egypt
Ramesses IX